Graftgold was an independent computer game developer that came to prominence in the 1980s, producing numerous computer games on a variety of 8-bit, 16-bit and 32-bit platforms.

History

The Hewson Era
The studio Graftgold was formed in 1983 when Steve Turner quit his day job as a commercial programmer to concentrate on producing computer games. When the work became too much for him to do alone, he hired a close friend, Andrew Braybrook, to work for him. After a small period of time developing games for the Dragon home computer, Graftgold soon turned their attention to the more lucrative Commodore 64 and ZX Spectrum markets.

Much of Graftgold's early success came about through their association with Hewson Consultants. Formed by Andrew Hewson in the early 1980s, Hewson Consultants became one of the UK's most successful computer game publishers. Whereas many publishers at the time relied on larger parent companies to handle the manufacturing of their products, Andrew Hewson owned his own cassette duplication plant, affording them much greater control over their ability to respond to market trends. Many of Graftgold's most memorable titles were published by Hewson, including Paradroid, Uridium, Quazatron , and Ranarama.

The Telecomsoft Era
Towards the end of the 1980s, it became apparent that Hewson Consultants suffered financial difficulties. Steve Turner decided it would be in Graftgold's best interest to seek another publisher. They left their partnership with Hewson and signed a publishing deal with Telecomsoft, the software division of British Telecom. Two of Hewson's in-house programmers, Dominic Robinson and John Cumming left the company to join Graftgold.

Hewson was not happy to see their most successful development partner leave, particularly because Graftgold was due to deliver two keenly anticipated titles -- Magnetron (by Steve Turner for the ZX Spectrum) and Morpheus (by Andrew Braybrook for the C64). Graftgold argued that since they were not contracted to Hewson, they were within their rights to seek an alternative publisher. Unable to sustain a legal battle, Hewson eventually settled with Telecomsoft out of court and parted company with Graftgold.

Graftgold produced several titles for Telecomsoft from 1987 until 1989, including their first arcade conversion, Flying Shark. However, the sale of Telecomsoft to MicroProse in 1989 resulted in their critically acclaimed conversion of Rainbow Islands being eventually released by Ocean Software.

The MicroProse/Activision Era
The dawn of the 1990s saw a shift in the way computer games were developed. Whereas the games of the 8-bit era were typically developed by a single individual within a matter of weeks to months, the more demanding 16-bit titles required larger teams, longer development times and considerably larger budgets. Royalties from their impressive catalogue of titles allowed Graftgold to make this transition with ease, hiring 30 additional people to work on a large number of products. 

Graftgold's path through the 16-bit era, however, would remain rocky. Deals with Hewson Consultants and Activision proved disastrous. Hewson's liquidation forced them to sell the publishing rights for Paradroid 90 to Activision. While the game sold an average number of copies on the Amiga and Atari ST, a PC Engine version that had been in development was shelved. To make matters worse, Graftgold had also been developing Realms, an expensive real-time strategy game, for Activision when it was announced that the publishing giant was in severe financial difficulty and had begun closing down many of its international operations. No longer contracted to develop any titles for MicroProse, the future of Graftgold looked bleak.

The Virgin/Renegade Era
Graftgold’s salvation came from Virgin Interactive. Graftgold already had a working relationship with Virgin through their development of Super Off Road. Having repurchased the rights for Realms from Activision, Graftgold finished the game for Virgin. From 1991 to 1993, Graftgold concentrated on Sega's primary gaming platforms — the Master System, Game Gear and Mega Drive — developing and converting numerous titles for these consoles for Virgin.

As Graftgold was developing Sega games for Virgin, Graftgold also struck up a publishing deal with Renegade. Renegade salvaged a number of products that had initially been promised to Mirrorsoft, publishing both Graftgold's critically acclaimed Fire and Ice platform game on multiple platforms and Uridium 2 on the Amiga.

Somewhere between the early and mid-1990s, two things happened which would prove to be the beginning of the end for Graftgold. The 8-bit console formats stopped being viable as the Nintendo Entertainment System and Master System made way for 16-bit consoles. As a consequence, Graftgold's 8-bit conversion work was stopped. The Amiga and Atari ST were also becoming obsolete as gaming platforms. By the time Graftgold had completed all their contractual obligations for the 8-bit consoles and 16-bit computers, it was already too late to establish a significant foothold within the 16-bit console market. Graftgold would only develop one title apiece for the Mega Drive and Super NES (Ottifants and Empire Soccer 94, respectively, although the latter would remain unpublished).

The fledgling PlayStation market remained a difficult nut to crack. Just as the transition from 8-bit to 16-bit had escalated development costs and required a significant expansion of resources, so too did the transition from 16-bit to 32-bit platforms. PlayStation development kits were notoriously expensive. Graftgold were able to afford enough to allow them to begin development on International MotoX and a PlayStation conversion of Rainbow Islands. Still, they could not afford to develop any other titles. Their finances now depended on these two titles.

The Warner/Perfect Era
Renegade, who owned the publishing rights for International MotoX, was eventually acquired by Time Warner Interactive, but the Warner company soon began to reconsider their software publishing strategy. Graftgold's game was finished but remained unpublished for six months. By the time it was finally released, it had made enough profit to cover the large advances afforded to Graftgold, but very little extra income beyond that. Rainbow Islands (packaged with a conversion of Bubble Bobble) failed to ignite the interest of PlayStation gamers.

With very little income coming their way from their two PlayStation titles, Graftgold found it difficult to develop Hardcorps, the one title they were contracted to produce for a little-known publisher by the name of Coconuts. With an advance far below what was required to finance the game's production, Graftgold began laying off staff. An eleventh-hour rescue bid from another developer, Perfect 10 Productions (responsible for the highly successful Discworld adventure games), helped finance Graftgold long enough to seek out an alternative publishing deal for Hardcorps with Psygnosis, but this fell through after numerous delays.

Graftgold finally folded in 1998.

In 2014 Steve Turner appeared in the documentary feature film From Bedrooms to Billions (2014), a film that tells the story of the British video game industry from 1979 to present.

List of Games

Key personnel

Steve Turner

After leaving a job in commercial programming in 1982, Steve Turner decided to concentrate on freelance computer game development. Initially forming a company called ST Software, Turner rechristened the company Graftgold after employing his friend, Andrew Braybrook, to assist him with programming duties.

Turner's solo projects for Graftgold included 3D Space Wars, Astroclone, Quazatron, Ranarama and Magnetron for the ZX Spectrum. He later contributed towards most of Graftgold's later projects on the 16-bit and 32-bit platforms.

Since the demise of Graftgold, Turner has continued to work in the IT industry.

Andrew Braybrook

After a brief stint programming games for the Dragon home computer, Braybrooks chief success was the publication of Gribbly's Day Out by Hewson in 1985. The game combined elements of platform games and shoot-'em ups with colorful, cartoon-like graphics.

Towards the end of 1985 came Braybrook's Paradroid. Regarded by many C64 gamers as one of the greatest games ever made, Paradroid was a shoot-'em up that featured exceptionally intelligent enemies, unique gameplay and fast-scrolling bas relief graphics that were quickly emulated by many other developers.

Two more Braybrook games arrived in 1986. Uridium was a horizontally scrolling shoot-'em up that required the player to navigate the hazardous surface of a number of colossal dreadnaughts, strafing targets whilst simultaneously avoiding waves of fighters that screamed past at blistering speeds. Alleykat arrived later in the year. Balanced somewhere between a vertically scrolling racer and a shoot-'em up, the game (while technically impressive) proved to be exceptionally difficult and disappointed a significant percentage of Braybrook's fan base.

Braybrook's next title, Morpheus, was published by Rainbird (Telecomsoft) in 1987. Combining elements of resource development games and the time-honoured shoot-'em up, Morpheus was Braybrook's most adventurous game to date. Despite intriguing gameplay and impressive graphics, the high learning curve and somewhat experimental gameplay translated into poor sales. The last of Braybrook's classic C64 titles, Intensity, arrived in 1988. A slightly more strategic shoot-'em up, the game enjoyed modest success.

Braybrook went on to develop a number of titles for the Amiga, including the conversion of Rainbow Islands and sequels to Paradroid and Uridium before joining the rest of the Graftgold team developing their 16-bit and 32-bit titles. Braybrook remained with Graftgold until the company's demise in 1998, at which time he was working on PC and PlayStation versions of Hardcorps. He then worked for a UK-based insurance company writing and deploying software until 2022, when he retired. He is now developing PC games.

Dominic Robinson

Dominic Robinson came to prominence as an in-house programmer for Hewson when he converted Uridium to the Spectrum (a feat previously considered unlikely) in 1986. This was followed by another classic Spectrum shoot-'em up, Zynaps, and a puzzle/shooter, Anarchy, both of which were released in 1987. After leaving Hewson, he joined Graftgold to work on the Spectrum conversion of Flying Shark, as well as the Amiga and Atari ST versions of Simulcra and Rainbow Islands.

References

External links
Graftgold's historical website
List of Graftgold games
History of Graftgold (archive of former Graftgold web site)
Jester Interactive Publishing Limited (Current owners of Graftgold and all its I.P.)

Defunct video game companies of the United Kingdom
Video game companies established in 1983
Video game companies disestablished in 1998